Drosera bulbigena, the midget sundew, is an erect perennial tuberous species in the genus Drosera that is endemic to Western Australia and occurs in an area near Perth and to its south along the coast. D. bulbigena grows in swamps and winter-wet depressions.

D. bulbigena was first described and named by Alexander Morrison in 1903.

See also 
List of Drosera species

References 

Carnivorous plants of Australia
Caryophyllales of Australia
Eudicots of Western Australia
Plants described in 1903
bulbigena